Punnami Naagu may refer to:
 Punnami Naagu (1980 film), an Indian Telugu-language horror drama film
 Punnami Naagu (2009 film), a Telugu-language female-centric horror film